Tinhou is a town in western Ivory Coast. It is a sub-prefecture of Bloléquin Department in Cavally Region, Montagnes District.

Tinhou was a commune until March 2012, when it became one of 1126 communes nationwide that were abolished.

In 2014, the population of the sub-prefecture of Tinhou was 13,293.

Villages
The 6 villages of the sub-prefecture of Tinhou and their population in 2014 are:
 Dédjan (1 888)
 Koadéguézon (1 708)
 Petit-Guiglo (1 803)
 Tinhou (5 370)
 Tuambly (1 502)
 Zou-Yahi (1022)

References

Sub-prefectures of Cavally Region
Former communes of Ivory Coast